The 2017 Dutch Open Grand Prix officially Yonex Dutch Open 2017 was a badminton tournament which took place at Topsportcentrum in Almere in the Netherlands on 10 to 15 October 2017 and had a total purse of $65,000.

Tournament
The 2017 Dutch Open Grand Prix is the fourteenth Grand Prix's badminton tournament of the 2017 BWF Grand Prix Gold and Grand Prix and also part of the Dutch Open championships which has been held since 1932. This tournament organized by the Badminton Nederland, with the sanctioned from the BWF.

Venue
This international tournament will be held at Topsportcentrum Pierre de Coubertinplein 4 in Almere in the Netherlands.

Point distribution
Below is the tables with the point distribution for each phase of the tournament based on the BWF points system for the Grand Prix event.

Prize money
The total prize money for this year tournament is US$65,000. Distribution of prize money will be in accordance with BWF regulations.

Men's singles

Seeds

 Wang Tzu-wei (semifinals)
 Ajay Jayaram (withdrew)
 Hans-Kristian Vittinghus (quarterfinals)
 Fabian Roth (withdrew)
 Emil Holst (quarterfinals)
 Pablo Abián (third round)
 Mark Caljouw (semifinals)
 Vladimir Malkov (third round)
 Lucas Corvée (second round)
 Misha Zilberman (quarterfinals)
 Kieran Merrilees (third round)
 Eetu Heino (second round)
 Yu Igarashi (final)
 Rasmus Gemke (second round)
 Subhankar Dey (third round)
 Kalle Koljonen (second round)

Finals

Top half

Section 1

Section 2

Section 3

Section 4

Bottom half

Section 5

Section 6

Section 7

Section 8

Women's singles

Seeds

 Beiwen Zhang (champion)
 Mette Poulsen (quarterfinals)
 Mia Blichfeldt (quarterfinals)
 Linda Zetchiri (withdrew)
 Natalia Koch Rohde (semifinals)
 Michelle Li (final)
 Fabienne Deprez (second round)
 Haruko Suzuki (quarterfinals)

Finals

Top half

Section 1

Section 2

Bottom half

Section 3

Section 4

Men's doubles

Seeds

 Ricky Karanda Suwardi / Angga Pratama (second round)
 Takuto Inoue / Yuki Kaneko (final)
 Marcus Ellis / Chris Langridge (quarterfinals)
 Berry Angriawan / Hardianto (semifinals)
 Liao Min-chun / Su Cheng-heng (champion)
 Jones Ralfy Jansen / Josche Zurwonne (semifinals)
 Manu Attri / B. Sumeeth Reddy (first round)
 Peter Briggs / Tom Wolfenden (second round)

Finals

Top half

Section 1

Section 2

Bottom half

Section 3

Section 4

Women's doubles

Seeds

 Anggia Shitta Awanda / Ni Ketut Mahadewi Istirani (final)
 Lim Yin Loo / Yap Cheng Wen (semifinals)
 Chow Mei Kuan / Lee Meng Yean (quarterfinals)
 Ashwini Ponnappa / N. Sikki Reddy (withdrew)
 Lauren Smith / Sarah Walker (quarterfinals)
 Julie Finne-Ipsen / Rikke Søby (withdrew)
 Ayako Sakuramoto / Yukiko Takahata (semifinals)
 Johanna Goliszewski / Lara Käpplein (second round)

Finals

Top half

Section 1

Section 2

Bottom half

Section 3

Section 4

Mixed doubles

Seeds

 Pranaav Jerry Chopra / N. Sikki Reddy (withdrew)
 Ronan Labar / Audrey Fontaine (second round)
 Sam Magee / Chloe Magee (first round)
 Ben Lane / Jessica Pugh (semifinals)
 Chan Peng Soon / Cheah Yee See (first round)
 Jacco Arends / Selena Piek (final)
 Robin Tabeling / Cheryl Seinen (first round)
 Marcus Ellis / Lauren Smith (champion)

Finals

Top half

Section 1

Section 2

Bottom half

Section 3

Section 4

References

External links
 Official site
 Tournament Link

Dutch Open (badminton)
BWF Grand Prix Gold and Grand Prix
Open Grand Prix
Dutch Open Grand Prix
Dutch Open Grand Prix
Sports competitions in Almere